David Manley is an American philosopher specializing in metaphysics, effective altruism, critical reasoning, and ethics. He formerly published widely in natural language semantics, ontology, and epistemology. He is Associate Professor of Philosophy at the University of Michigan, Ann Arbor, Michigan.

Work

Professor Manley's papers in the philosophy of language, metaphysics, and epistemology have appeared in such journals as Nous, The Journal of Philosophy, Mind, and PPR.

External links
David Manley's academic CV
David Manley's department web site
David Manley's personal web site
list of articles published by Professor Manley

21st-century American philosophers
Epistemologists
Living people
Metaphysicians
Philosophers of language
University of Michigan faculty
Year of birth missing (living people)